David Leuty (born 25 February 1960) is a Canadian bobsledder. He competed at the 1984 Winter Olympics and the 1988 Winter Olympics.

References

1960 births
Living people
Canadian male bobsledders
Olympic bobsledders of Canada
Bobsledders at the 1984 Winter Olympics
Bobsledders at the 1988 Winter Olympics
Sportspeople from Toronto